Leila de Souza Sobral Freitas (born November 22, 1974, in São Paulo) is a basketball player from Brazil, who with the women's national team won the 1994 FIBA World Championship for Women in Australia and the silver medal at the 1996 Summer Olympics in Atlanta, Georgia. Her sister Marta Sobral was also part of the national team.

References 
 Profile (archive)

1974 births
Living people
Brazilian expatriate basketball people in the United States
Brazilian women's basketball players
Basketball players at the 1996 Summer Olympics
Basketball players at the 2004 Summer Olympics
Olympic basketball players of Brazil
Olympic silver medalists for Brazil
Olympic medalists in basketball
Basketball players from São Paulo
Medalists at the 1996 Summer Olympics